Phantom Ranger is a 1938 American Western film directed by Sam Newfield.

Cast 
Tim McCoy as Tim Hayes
Suzanne Kaaren as Joan Doyle
Karl Hackett as Sharpe
John St. Polis as Pat Doyle
John Merton as Henchman Bud
Edward Earle as Matthews
Robert Frazer as Chief McGregor
Harry Strang as Henchman Jeff
Charles King as Henchman Dan
Richard Cramer as Barton
Tom London as Reynolds
Bruce Warren as Rogers
Robert McKenzie as Saloon-Owner Charlie
Jimmy Aubrey as Telegraph Operator

External links 

1938 films
1930s action adventure films
1930s mystery films
American mystery films
1930s English-language films
American black-and-white films
American action adventure films
Monogram Pictures films
1938 Western (genre) films
American Western (genre) films
Films directed by Sam Newfield
1930s American films